Agnodice or Agnodike ( Agnodikē,  c. 4th century BCE) is a legendary figure credited as the first female midwife or physician in ancient Athens. Her story is told by the Roman author Gaius Julius Hyginus in his Fabulae.  Agnodice is not generally believed to be a historical figure, but her story has been frequently deployed as a precedent for women practising midwifery or medicine, or as an argument against either of these.

According to Hyginus, Agnodice studied medicine under Herophilus, and worked as a physician in her home city of Athens disguised as a man, because women at the time were forbidden from practising medicine. As her popularity with female patients grew, rival physicians accused her of seducing the women of Athens. She was tried, and revealed her sex to the jury by lifting her tunic (a gesture known in ancient Greek as anasyrma). Accused of illegally practising medicine as a woman, she was defended by the women of Athens who praised her for her effective treatments. She was acquitted, and the law against female physicians in Athens was revoked.

Life story
According to Hyginus, Agnodice lived in ancient Athens, where at the time women were forbidden from studying medicine. In order to learn medicine, she disguised herself as a man, cutting her hair short, and studied under Herophilus in Alexandria. Having trained as a physician, Agnodice tried to assist women in labour, who were ashamed of, or blatantly refused to consult male practitioners.  In one case, Agnodice therefore revealed her sex and was permitted to treat the woman.  Other doctors, growing jealous of Agnodice's success, accused her of seducing her patients. On trial before the Areopagus, Agnodice lifted her clothes, revealing that she was a woman. She was charged with breaking the law which forbade women from practising medicine, but was defended by the wives of important Athenians whom she had treated.  In response to this, the law was changed to allow women to practise medicine.

Hyginus describes Agnodice as an obstetrix. It is difficult to know how to translate this into English. Sarah Pomeroy has rendered it as "obstetrician", arguing that midwives existed in Athens in Agnodice's day but that Agnodice was distinguished by her formal education in medicine. However, Helen King notes that there was no "formal licensing system" for medics in the ancient world, and that it is anachronistic to divide ancient healers into the distinct categories of "midwife" and "obstetrician".

Historicity
Modern scholars generally doubt that Agnodice was a real historical figure.  Problems with accepting Agnodice as historical include questions over her date, and the implausibility of Hyginus' claim that there were no "obstetrices" in Athens before Agnodice, when literary and epigraphic evidence shows that midwives were known. Hyginus claims that Agnodice was taught medicine by "a certain Herophilus" – generally identified with Herophilus of Chalcedon, an ancient physician known for his work on gynaecology who was credited with the discovery of the ovaries.  If this is the case, Agnodice would have lived in the late fourth or early third century BCE.

Stories similar to that of Agnodice can be found in various different contexts, including other stories of the display of the female body in Greco-Roman culture as well as ancient Mediterranean, Western folk, or world ethnography. Interpretation of the story varies according to whether we foreground links to ancient medical practice, or to visual artistic artefacts outside the literary canon.

Those who believe in the historicity of Agnodice have come to two separate conclusions explaining the lack of midwives in Athens before her. The first theory is that there were no midwives prior to Agnodice; alternatively, it has been proposed that there were earlier midwives but they had been forbidden by law from practising. This second theory has been elaborated over time, with Kate Hurd-Mead, in 1938, being the first to propose that women had been forbidden from practising medicine because they had been accused of performing abortions, an interpretation of the story with no foundation which has been repeated by some modern feminist historians of women in medicine such as Margaret Alic.

Female doctors in Ancient Greece
In the opening words of the story told by Hyginus, 'the ancients had no midwives'; however, at the end of the story, freeborn women are permitted to learn 'medicine'. This leaves open the question of whether Agnodice is supposed to be the first midwife or the first female physician. Nancy Demand argued that, in the Hippocratic period, some midwives increased their status by working alongside male physicians. However, the difficulty of putting a date on the period when the Agnodice story is set means that we cannot tie it to this argument. Outside the story, we have evidence not only of midwives in ancient Greece but also of female physicians, who may have treated all patients rather than only women and children.

Influence on women in medicine
The story of Agnodice has been invoked since the sixteenth century to provide precedents for a range of gender options within the medical profession. While some later users of the story focused on the midwifery claims in the opening line, for example arguing that men were midwives before women were, or that women were midwives first, others have concentrated on what Agnodice is supposed to have learned from Herophilus, which was medicine rather than midwifery. Thus she was used both in the peak of men-midwifery in the eighteenth century and in women's struggle to enter the medical profession in the nineteenth century. Elizabeth Cellier, the seventeenth century "Popish midwife", positioned herself as a modern Agnodice. Although she appears in a list of 'Who discovered/invented what', she is represented more as someone who bridges the gap between the knowledge of male doctors ("a certain Herophilus") and the delivery of this knowledge to women who are embarrassed to show their bodies to a male doctor. 

However, others have taken the story of Agnodice as a negative example: Augustus Kinsley Gardner, for instance, in 1851 delivered a lecture arguing that "literally, no improvement was made" in the "many centuries" where midwifery was a women's profession, comparing Agnodice to the 19th century abortionist Madame Restell.

Notes

References

External links 

 

4th-century BC Greek physicians
Ancient Athenian women
Ancient Greek women physicians
4th-century BC Athenians
4th-century BC Greek women
Ancient gynaecologists
Female-to-male cross-dressers
Midwifery